"Sing Your Life" is a single by English singer-songwriter Morrissey released in April 1991. It was the second single taken from the Kill Uncle album. On release this was Morrissey's lowest charting single in the UK charts, reaching only number 33. One of the single's B-sides was a cover version of "That's Entertainment" by The Jam which had backing vocals by Chas Smash, a.k.a. Carl Smyth the second singer of the band Madness. Vic Reeves also recorded backing vocals for the song, but they weren't included in the final version. He is thanked in the sleeve notes.

Critical review
Stuart Maconie in NME gave the single a positive review, calling it "toe-tapping". Ned Raggett of AllMusic called the song "one of Morrissey's subtler pieces, and also one with a more upbeat and straightforward message than most."

Live performances
The song was performed live by Morrissey on his 1991 Kill Uncle tour. The song was last performed on 6 October 1991, and was dropped from the set list for the rest of the tour. Along with all of the material from Kill Uncle, "Sing Your Life" has never been performed by Morrissey since the 1991 tour, but it is frequently requested by his audience. When Morrissey hears the request, he usually replies by saying "I'm singing it."

Track listings
7-inch vinyl and cassette
 "Sing Your Life"
 "That's Entertainment" (The Jam cover)

12-inch vinyl
 "Sing Your Life"
 "That's Entertainment" (The Jam cover)
 "The Loop"

CD
 "Sing Your Life"
 "That's Entertainment" (The Jam cover)
 "The Loop"

Musicians
 Morrissey – voice
 Mark E. Nevin – guitars
 Boz Boorer – guitars
 Andrew Paresi – drums
 Mark Bedford – bass

Charts

In popular culture
The song is featured prominently in season one, episode seven of the Netflix show Daybreak, when character Ms Crumble's passion for Morrissey's music forms an important plot point. It appears as the theme song of a fictitious post-apocalyptic sitcom, in a Spanish version performed by Ms Crumble's Morrissey cover band, and as a duet by characters Angelica (Alyvia Alyn Lind and Ms Crumble Krysta Rodriguez). The episode itself is called "Canta Tu Vida", the Spanish translation of the song's title.

References

Morrissey songs
1991 singles
1991 songs
His Master's Voice singles
Song recordings produced by Alan Winstanley
Song recordings produced by Clive Langer
Songs written by Mark Nevin
Songs written by Morrissey